The men triples started the 2006 Commonwealth Games with 1 group of 6 and 3 groups of 5. In the Group Stage New Zealand was actually beaten by Northern Ireland in the 3rd round of Group 2 to finish second in their group. Group 3 also had an upset as Kenya beat Australia 2 sets to 1. The loss didn't prevent Australia from qualifying for the Quarter Finals, winning Group 3 ahead of Malta. The other second place teams were Malaysia, New Zealand and South Africa while Cook Islands, Northern Ireland and England won their groups to qualify for the quarterfinals. In the 2nd quarterfinal Australia had to take on New Zealand which was a tight showdown. Northern Ireland surprised England in the semi finals to qualify for their very first medal in bowls.  In the Gold medal show down Australia beat Northern Ireland 8-6 10-4 while South Africa took the Bronze.

Group stage

Group 1 

Men's Triples Group 1 Round 1

Men's Triples Group 1 Round 2

Men's Triples Group 1 Round 3

Men's Triples Group 1 Round 4

Men's Triples Group 1 Round 5

Group 2 

Men's Triples Group 2 Round 1

Men's Triples Group 2 Round 2

Men's Triples Group 2 Round 3

Men's Triples Group 2 Round 4

Men's Triples Group 2 Round 5

Group 3 

Men's Triples Group 3 Round 1

Men's Triples Group 3 Round 2

Men's Triples Group 3 Round 3

Men's Triples Group 3 Round 4

Men's Triples Group 3 Round 5

Group 4 

Men's Triples Group 4 Round 1

Men's Triples Group 4 Round 2

Men's Triples Group 4 Round 3

Men's Triples Group 4 Round 4

Men's Triples Group 4 Round 5

Final Rounds

17th to 20th 

Men's Triples 17th-20th Round 1

Men's Triples 17th-20th Round 2

Men's Triples 17th-20th Round 3

13th to 16th 

Men's Triples 13th-16th Round 1

Men's Triples 13th-16th Round 2

Men's Triples 13th-16th Round 3

9th to 12th 

Men's Triples 9th-12th Round 1

Men's Triples 9th-12th Round 2

Men's Triples 9th-12th Round 3

Knockout stages 

Lawn bowls at the 2006 Commonwealth Games